The 2015–16 Wellington Phoenix FC season was the club's ninth season since its establishment in 2007. The club participated in the A-League for the ninth time, the FFA Cup for the second time, and fielded a reserves squad in the ASB Premiership for the second time.

Players

Squad information

From youth squad

Transfers in

Transfers out

Contracts Extensions

Technical staff

Statistics

Squad statistics

|-
|colspan="24"|Players no longer at the club:

Pre-season and friendlies

Competitions

Overall

A-League

League table

Results summary

Results by round

Matches

FFA Cup

ASB Premiership

League table

Results summary

Results by round

Matches

References

External links
 Official Website

Wellington Phoenix
Wellington Phoenix FC seasons